Padroense Futebol Clube  is a Portuguese football club that competes in the Portuguese Second Division. They were founded in 1922.

History
The first field of Padroense F. C. was the "Saibreira" before moving to the "stray field" (what is now High School), to finally go to the Monte da Mina, near the land which today is the Church of the Standard A league.

The clubhouse was originally a small room in the house of Mr. Justino, where he kept all the belongings of the club, then moving to the house of the Tamanqueiros to finally settle in the Rua Nova do Seixo, called the second home of "Mr. Abbot" that belonged to the priest Meão, which coincidences of fate is now the personal residence of the current President Germano Pinho.

The first equipment was made in white cloth by a dressmaker, had a single red stripe, horizontal, and white shorts, unlike the current, which shows three white horizontal red stripes and blue shorts.

The only sport practiced in this first phase of the club  was football.

The first official game was played with Leixões, in the old field of Santana.

The club competed in the Division 1 League for the Promotion of the municipality of Matosinhos, winning the title, at least in the years 1932, 1933 and 1934, as listed in the Diploma in currently existing assets of the club.
At a date not fully determined, the club participated in the contest of the Cup of Portugal, and the game played with Leixões in the old stadium of Amial.

The biggest victory of Padroense F. C., throughout its existence, was achieved against Baliense (23–2) in the field of Monte da Mina.

From 1948 onward the club successively expanded its sports sections, such as football, volleyball, table tennis, billiards, cycling, boxing, handball and recreational fishing, in addition to these a section of theatre and representation was also created. Subsequently, because of material difficulties, human and financial, some of these sections have fallen into inactivity, with only the sections of football and handball remaining active.

The clubhouse at the time at Rua Nova do Seixo, the priest's house, was moved to a building of its own, where there are now two shops owned by the club, and in 1998 it was fixated at the Stadium Club, where it still remains.

Football

Football is the only modality that has remained continuously in operation, having achieved over all these years some regional titles.

The greatest achievement of his first team was registered in the year 2003/2004 with getting second place in the championship division of the District of honor from the Porto Football Association, which gave access to the National Championship 3. Division, where militates currently in season 2004/2005.

It is also in the 2004/2005 season Padroense back to participate in the Taça de Portugal, was eliminated after extra time by Canedo for 3 to 4.

It is not clear when it created the junior section, but it is thought to have happened in 1958. The youth section was created in the 1973/74 season. In the 2000/2001 season Padroense became the first club with more players in the national team Under 16, with 6 players, at that time amounted to the Junior National Championship B where they take part in the 2004/2005 season, this time counting with five international at this level.

Handball

This section was created in 1955 with the mode of eleven. The first game was against Infesta for the Popular Championship. Only later did the club began in the form of seven and made the first game with the Leça, losing 10–9 and then won every other league regional 2nd Division and were therefore left in 1st year champion 1956/57. For the higher division, competed in the Sports Pavilion, two games with the progress that won respectively by 11–9 and 17–8.

In the form of seven, in addition to having been champion of Division 2 in the category of Regional Seniors in 1956/57, there is still a record winning the National Juniors Championship in 1964/65 and a brilliant 4th place in National Youth Championship in 1971, which was created this category.

In the form of eleven, there have been a victory in the Regional Championship 2nd Division 1959/60 and the repetition of the same in 1966/1967.

In this mode the Padroense proud to have the following international: Manuel Mendes – 1960, Joaquim Seabra – 1965, Jorge Falapim – 1965 – captain of the Junior National Team.

Has Padroense FC, in these days of open channels of development cooperation with other clubs with the greatest impact and projection, as Leixões SC and FC Porto's what makes the future will be increasingly brighter and promising.
In fact the growth and modernization of the Club, is through the persistent work of its entire community, but also to exchange with other institutions.

References

External links
 Squad at ForaDeJogo 

Football clubs in Portugal
Association football clubs established in 1922
1922 establishments in Portugal
Sport in Matosinhos